St. Pius X Preparatory Seminary was the minor seminary of the Diocese of Rockville Centre. It was founded in 1961 and closed in 1984.

It was originally headquartered in Hempstead, New York, but moved to its permanent home on Front Street in Uniondale, New York in the early 1960s.  At that time, it served as both a high school seminary and a two-year junior college.  After the establishment of Cathedral College of the Immaculate Conception, the junior college portion closed in 1968.  St. Pius X's high school was closed in 1984.

Notable alumni
 Joe Donnelly, Democrat of Indiana, U.S. Senate (2013- 2018), U.S. House of Representatives (2007-2013)
 Sean Hannity, Media Personality, Host of “Hannity” on Fox News Channel
 Kevin McCormack, Deacon, Co-Host of WABC (AM)'s Religion on the Line Sunday morning broadcast
 Peter Jurasik Film and Television Actor,celebrated for the role of Londo Mollari on Babylon 5.

References

External links
St. Pius X Preparatory Seminary Alumni Association

Defunct private universities and colleges in New York (state)
Defunct Catholic universities and colleges in the United States
Educational institutions established in 1961
Educational institutions disestablished in 1984
1961 establishments in New York (state)
Catholic universities and colleges in New York (state)
Seminaries and theological colleges in New York (state)